Jõesuu is a village in Tori Parish, Pärnu County in southwestern Estonia.

Location

Population

Jõesuu has a population of 389 (as of 2003).

Name
Th name Jõesuu meaning "river mouth" in Estonian refers to the mouth of the Navesti River.

Gallery

References

Villages in Pärnu County